The May 2nd Square is a square located in the historic center of Lima. 

Its construction was commissioned by the Peruvian government in the 1870s to commemorate the Battle of Callao, which had taken place on May 2, 1866. It was built over a previous square known as the Oval of the Queen, located near the gates of the city, which had since been overrun by urban growth. The square is dominated by a central monument, built in France and reassembled in Peru between 1873 and 1874, allowing the square to be inaugurated in July 1874. The architect was Edmond Guillaume; the sculptor of the finial figure of Nike and the historical and allegorical bronzes was Louis-Léon Cugnot.  

Several important avenues have radiate out of the plaza, including Alfonso Ugarte, Colmena and Colonial. In the late 20th century a vehicular tunnel was built under the plaza to curb traffic congestions.

References 
 Arqandina

Dos